Félix Balyu (5 August 1891 – 15 January 1971) was a Belgian association football player who competed in the 1920 Summer Olympics.
He was a member of the Belgium team, which won the gold medal in the football tournament.

References

External links
 

1891 births
1971 deaths
Belgian footballers
Footballers at the 1920 Summer Olympics
Olympic footballers of Belgium
Olympic gold medalists for Belgium
Belgium international footballers
Olympic medalists in football
Medalists at the 1920 Summer Olympics
Footballers from Bruges
Association football midfielders
20th-century Belgian people